Marya Freund (12 December 1876 – 21 May 1966) was a German Empire French soprano.

Career 
She studied violin with Pablo de Sarasate, then singing with Henri Criticos and Raymond Zur Mühlen. In 1913 she took part in the creation of Arnold Schönberg's Gurrelieder in Vienna and became the appointed interpreter of the Pierrot lunaire. Her repertoire, especially that of the 20th, included Gustav Mahler, Gabriel Fauré, Claude Debussy, Maurice Ravel, Igor Stravinsky, Francis Poulenc, Karol Szymanowski. She worked within the circle of Satie, Cocteau and Les Six, appearing in the premiere of Satie's Socrate in 1920.

In the 1920s, she began a career as a teacher and gave some advice to Germaine Lubin. Jewish, she was arrested in February 1944 in occupied France. Marya Freund was the mother of bass singer Doda Conrad.

Sources 
Alain Paris Dictionnaire des interprètes Bouquins/Robert Laffont 1990 (p. 382)

References

External links 
 Marya Freund on Oxford reference
 Marya Freund papers (the singer's personal papers) in the Music Division of The New York Public Library for the Performing Arts
 Marya Freund on  Encyclopédie Larousee
 Bits and Pieces: Researching the Life of Marya Freund on musicalgeography.org
 Marya Freund 1876-1966 Polish-born French Inscribed: Sovenir of Marya Freund and the opera on Scholar commons
 Portrait de la cantatrice Marya Freund et de ses enfants Stefan Freund, et le futur Doda Conrad, 1913 on Artnet

1876 births
Musicians from Wrocław
French people of Polish-Jewish descent
French operatic sopranos
1966 deaths
German emigrants to France